Barra do Bugres is a municipality in the state of Mato Grosso in the Central-West Region of Brazil.

See also
List of municipalities in Mato Grosso
Tapirapuã, a district of Barra do Bugres

References

 
Mayor of Barra do Bugres physically threatens female journalist

Municipalities in Mato Grosso